Tyrian shekels, tetradrachms, or tetradrachmas were coins of Tyre, which in the Roman Empire took on an unusual role as the medium of payment for the Temple tax in Jerusalem, and subsequently gained notoriety as a likely mode of payment for Judas Iscariot. 

In the latest standard, which was also the one used for the temple tax, the coins bore the likeness of the Phoenician god Melqart or Baal, accepted as the Olympian Herakles by the Greeks and derided as Beelzebub by Jews in the time of the Seleucids, wearing the laurel reflecting his role in the Tyrian games and the ancient Olympic Games. 

They also bore the Greek inscription  ('of Tyre the holy [city] and [city] of refuge'). The coins were the size of a modern Israeli half-shekel and were issued by Tyre, in that form, between 126 BC and AD 56. Earlier Tyrian coins with the value of a tetradrachm, bearing various inscriptions and images, had been issued from the second half of the fifth century BC. 

After the Roman Empire closed down the mint in Tyre, the Roman authorities allowed the Jewish rabbanim to continue minting Tyrian shekels in Judaea, but with the requirement that the coins should continue to bear the same image and text to avoid objections that the Jews were given autonomy. They were replaced by First Jewish Revolt coinage in 66 AD. 

The Tyrian shekels were considered tetradrachms by the Greeks, as they weighed four Athenian drachmas, about 14 grams , more than earlier 11-gram shekels but regarded as equivalent for religious duties at that time. Because Roman coinage was only 80% silver, the purer (94% or more) Tyrian shekels were required to pay the temple tax in Jerusalem. 

The money changers referenced in the New Testament Gospels (Matt. 21:12 and parallels) provided Tyrian shekels in exchange for Roman currency when this was required.

See also

History of currency
List of historical currencies
Shekel
Carthaginian shekel, generally roughly half a Tyrian shekel
Jerusalem shekel
Bar Kochba shekel

References

Jews and Judaism in the Roman Empire
Coins in the Bible
History of Tyre, Lebanon
Phoenician currency